Thomas Vincent McDermott (born 1 June 2005) is an English professional footballer who plays as a midfielder for  club Salisbury, on loan from  club Port Vale.

Career
McDermott was named as Youth Player of the Year at Port Vale for the 2021–22 season after scoring six goals and providing eleven assists for the under-18s. He turned professional in July 2022, signing a three-year contract with the club retaining the option of a further 12 months; David Flitcroft, the club's director of football, said that "he is a player that will develop physically, technically and tactically over time". He made his professional debut in the English Football League at the age of 17 when he started the opening game of the 2022–23 season on 30 July, a 2–1 victory over Fleetwood Town at Vale Park. Having been played out of position as a forward due to the club being short of strikers, he played his first game in midfield against Stockport County in the EFL Trophy. His strike in Vale's 3–1 win against Chesterfield in the FA Youth Cup in November was nominated for the LFE Goal of the Month award. On 31 January 2023, he joined Southern League Premier Division South club Salisbury on a youth loan, alongside James Plant. He scored two goals in a 3–0 victory at Metropolitan Police on 4 March.

Career statistics

References

2005 births
Living people 
Footballers from Manchester
English footballers
Association football midfielders
English Football League players
Southern Football League players
Port Vale F.C. players
Salisbury F.C. players